San Diego Gas & Electric (SDGE) provides natural gas and electricity to San Diego County and southern Orange County in southwestern California, United States. It is owned by Sempra, a Fortune 500 energy services holding company based in San Diego. 

SDGE is a regulated public utility that provides energy service to 3.3 million consumers through 1.4 million electric meters and more than 840,000 natural gas meters in San Diego and southern Orange counties. The utility's area spans 4,100 square miles (10,600 square kilometers). SDGE employs about 5,000 people.

Energy sources
In 2004, the California Public Utilities Commission approved SDGE's long-term energy resource plan, which relies on a balanced mix of resources to meet the growing energy needs of San Diego. That mix includes increased emphasis on energy efficiency, more renewable energy resources, and additional baseload generation plants and transmission capacity. In 2014 SDGE had a renewables mix of 36.4%, more than the 33% requirement by 2020. By 2016, 43.2% of SDGE's electrical power sources were renewable.

SDGE's system includes 134 distribution substation, 10,558 miles of underground power systems, and 6,527 miles of overhead power systems.

Interconnections
SDGE has two 230 kV lines (Miguel-Tijuana line and the LaRosita-Imperial Valley Line) that connect the Californian transmission system with the Mexican Comisión Federal de Electricidad transmission system in Baja California. The Path 45 transmission corridor, spanning over the United States-Mexico border, has a capacity of 408 Megawatts. SDGE has a 500 kV line connecting to Arizona Public Service. There is also a 230 kV line connecting to Imperial Irrigation District. Both of these are part of the massive Path 46 transmission system ensuring Southern California has adequate energy.

The Sunrise Powerlink 117-mile, 500 kV transmission line linking San Diego to Imperial Valley, one of the most renewable-rich regions in California was put into service on June 18, 2012.

Early history

Henry H. Jones, a civil, construction and electrical engineer, came to San Diego in 1910 as vice president and manager of the San Diego Consolidated Gas & Electric Company and became president shortly thereafter.

Henry Harrison Jones was born in Reading, Pennsylvania, March 31, 1874, son of Richard Hall and Ellen (Hughes) Jones. After graduating from high school in 1890 he was a bookkeeper at the Second National Bank, then entered Lehigh University to pursue a technical course. He graduated as a Civil Engineer in 1897, then for a year was a draftsman and assistant engineer for the Chicago, Peoria and St. Louis Railroad Company in Springfield, Illinois, then a member of the general engineering staff of the Pennsylvania Railroad at Philadelphia until 1899, when he again went west. Until 1903 he was in Chicago as an assistant engineer of the Chicago & Northwestern Railroad. For seventeen years his work was chiefly confined to traction and electric power engineering. He was general superintendent for the Springfield Railway & Light Company at Springfield, Illinois, until 1909, and before coming to San Diego was the manager of the Northern Idaho & Montana Power Company. In 1910 he accepted the post of vice president and manager of the San Diego Consolidated Gas & Electric Company.

By 1920 the company furnished gas and electric service to San Diego city and forty adjacent towns and districts as far north as San Juan Capistrano in Orange County, and south to the Mexican border. When Jones took the management of the company in 1910 it had less than six thousand electric customers and less than nine thousand gas customers, while the number of customers in each branch in 1920 numbered nearly twenty-seven thousand. The quantity measure of service increased in proportion, necessitating the investment of millions of dollars in new equipment and distribution systems. The company in 1920 had five hundred and thirty miles of gas main and over seven hundred miles of electric poll lines.

Mr. Jones served as a director and member of the executive committee during the Panama-California Exposition (1915), whose group was responsible for the designing, creation and building the first, original structures and buildings in Balboa Park, San Diego, California.

United States v. San Diego Gas & Electric
First brought online in the mid-1950s, the Encanto Gas Holder was decommissioned in 2000-2001 by San Diego Gas and Electric, Sempra as the agent of SDGE, and the IT Corporation as the main contractor for the decommissioning. TriState was brought on board to abate strips of asbestos-containing pipe coating for another contractor to cut the holder bottle into  sections. TriState was later tasked with stripping the coating at the gas holder site despite employee and nearby residents' concerns over friable asbestos generated as a byproduct of the gross stripping processes employed by SDGE contractors.

In 2006, SDGE was indicted by U.S. Attorney Carol C. Lam in the Southern District of California on five counts, including conspiracy, fraud, and three counts of mishandling regulated asbestos-containing materials in violation of the National Emissions Standards for Hazardous Air Pollutants. Additional defendants included SDGE's director of environmental compliance, an uncertified asbestos removal consultant, and the IT Corporation project manager. Charges were dismissed without prejudice in November 2006, but the defendants were re-indicted in early 2007 on nearly identical charges, and the case was heard in San Diego's federal court in June and July 2007. On July 13, 2007, three guilty verdicts were returned against defendants SDGE, IT Corporation project manager Kyle Rhuebottom, and SDGE environmental specialist David "Willie" Williamson, including false statements, failure to provide adequate notice to government agencies of regulated asbestos on the site, and violating asbestos work practice standards  to avoid the cost of lawful environmental compliance. SDGE environmental director Jacquelyn McHugh was found not guilty, and defense attorneys vowed to appeal for  unjust prosecution.

In late 2007 U.S. District Judge Dana Sabraw ruled that SDGE and the workers deserved a new trial. Criminal charges were dismissed against SDGE on October 6, 2009.

2008 marine helicopter crash lawsuit
On September 3, 2008 a jury awarded $55.6 million to the families of four United States Marine aviators killed when their UH-1 helicopter crashed into a 130-foot-tall SDGE utility tower at Camp Pendleton.  The amount awarded included $15.2 million in compensatory damages and $40.4 million in punitive damages.  The jury held SDGE responsible for $9.48 million of the compensation amount and all of the punitive damages.

The company said the power line had been on the base for 25 years and that SDGE would have installed lights if the Marine Corps had asked. Since the crash, the company has installed lights, said Todd Macaluso, the lawyer for the families. SDGE said that it would appeal the judgment.

2011 county-wide power outage

On September 8, 2011, at 3:38 PM Pacific Standard Time, a major power outage left all 1.4 million SDGE customers without power. The problems started with a fault in an Arizona Public Service substation near Yuma, Arizona that caused widespread problems in western Arizona and eastern California. In time, SDGE's system was drawing from the San Onofre Nuclear Generating Station (SONGS) considerably more power than was being produced, pulling it from Los Angeles, and a "safety net" system cut it off from the nuclear plant. Once this happened, SDGE's system rapidly collapsed due to mismatch of generation and load, unable to drop load faster than generation was lost. SDGE implemented their system restoration plan and cautioned its customers to expect a prolonged outage. The outage appears to have been caused by the actions of an employee at APS's North Gila substation in Arizona, and it is unknown why safeguards did not keep the outage limited to the Yuma area.

By Friday morning on the 9th, power had been restored to all 1.4 million SDGE customers.

2020 Emmanuel Cafferty firing controversy
In the wake of the 2020 George Floyd protests and the subsequent attention brought onto topics related to racism and white supremacy, SDGE became the center of national controversy when it fired one of its employees, Emmanuel Cafferty (A Mexican-American), for allegedly displaying the OK gesture, a sign that had recently become associated with the alt-right and white power movement. Cafferty claimed that he was unaware of the connotations of the sign he was displaying. The story of Cafferty's termination was covered by national news publications and periodicals, and while SDGE has remained silent on the matter, it has faced scrutiny over the termination. Cafferty later filed a defamation lawsuit against his former employer.

References

Further reading

External links
 

Energy in California
Sempra Energy
Electric power companies of the United States
Natural gas companies of the United States
Companies based in San Diego
Non-renewable resource companies established in 1881
1881 establishments in California